Confidential may refer to:

 Confidential, a level of classified information
 Confidential (1935 film), a film directed by Edward L. Cahn
 Confidential (1986 film), a film directed by Bruce Pittman
 "Confidential", a 1959 song by The Fleetwoods
 Confidential (magazine), a gossip magazine
 Confidențial (Anda Adam album), 2005
 Confidential (Eyeliners album), 1997
 Confidential (M-1 album), 2006
 Confidential (High Contrast album), 2009
 Confidential (TV series), an Australian weekly entertainment news show

See also
 Confidentiality